Shakila (born 1962) is a Persian-American singer-songwriter.

Shakila may also refer to:
 Shakila (actress) (1935–2017), Indian film actress

See also
 Shakeela, Indian actress